Aundra Thompson (born January 2, 1953) is a former American football wide receiver in the National Football League. He played college football at Texas A&M-Commerce and was drafted by the Green Bay Packers in the fifth round of the 1976 NFL Draft. In 1981, he left the Packers and joined the San Diego Chargers.

Thompson also played for the New Orleans Saints and Baltimore Colts.

References

1953 births
Living people
American football wide receivers
Texas A&M–Commerce Lions football players
Green Bay Packers players
San Diego Chargers players
New Orleans Saints players
Baltimore Colts players